Qareh Vali (also Romanized as Qareh Valī and Qarah Valī; also known as Ghareh Vali, Qarāvalī, and Qarāwāli) is a village in Shivanat Rural District, Afshar District, Khodabandeh County, Zanjan Province, Iran. At the 2006 census, its population was 390, in 83 families.

References 

Populated places in Khodabandeh County